Samuel Solem (born 1 April 1999) is a Norwegian ice hockey player for Storhamar Ishockey and the Norwegian national team.

He represented Norway at the 2021 IIHF World Championship.

References

External links

1999 births
Living people
AIK IF players
Brynäs IF players
Karlskrona HK players
Norwegian expatriate ice hockey people
Norwegian expatriate sportspeople in Sweden
Norwegian ice hockey left wingers
People from Lørenskog
Sportspeople from Viken (county)